Martin Weiss may refer to:

 Martin Weiss (diplomat) (born 1962), Austrian diplomat and Ambassador of Austria to the United States
 Martin Weiss (Nazi official) (1903–1984), commander of Vilna Ghetto and the Ypatingasis būrys mass murder killing squad, convicted of war crimes (revoked)
 Martin Gottfried Weiss (1905–1946), SS Commander of German concentration camps, executed for war crimes

See also
 Martin Weis (born 1970), German silver medallist at the 1998 World Rowing Championships
 Martin Weisz (born 1966), German music video and film director